The Croatian Mountaineering Association covers both mountaineering and a broad range of related activities. Unlike the majority of the international mountaineering associations, the Association's remit extends to speleology, climbing, orienteering and mountain rescue.

The Association is responsible for the maintenance of mountain huts and paths in Croatia, and is the publisher of the magazine Hrvatski planinar (The Croatian Mountaineer) and of other promotional materials. Through schools and courses it provides relevant professional education and training. It is a comprehensive source of information of all kinds relating to Croatian mountains and mountaineering.

The operations of the Croatian Mountaineering Association are managed by its executive committee and its professional work is carried out through the commissions for:

Mountain Rescue;
 Guiding;
Caving;
 Alpinism;
 Competition Climbing;
Orienteering;
 Promotion & Publications;
 Mountain Paths;
 Environment;
 Awards;
 Husbandry;
 Legal matters;
 History of Mountaineering.

Members of the Association and members of the UIAA have a 50% discount on the cost of a night's accommodation in all huts in Croatia. Currently the Association numbers some 20,000 registered members from over 200 clubs and regional associations.

The association has created the Hrvatska planinarska obilaznica (HPO) or Croatian Mountaineering Bypass, a list of the most attractive peaks in all Croatian mountains with the intention of not only to bring as many people as possible to interesting peaks, but also to instruct them to get to know the beauties of the Croatian mountains systematically, in a targeted and thoughtful way.  Each of the 153 peaks have a checkpoint and metal stamp which the hiker can record their visit in a log book or passport (as the Croatians call it).

The predecessor organization Croatian Climbing Society was founded in 1874, which puts the Croats among the first seven nations in the world with a climbing organization. Organised climbing activity in Croatia was directed in its early days towards scientific research into the natural features of the mountains, rather than towards the conquest of peaks as an end in itself. This focus was one reason for the extent to which leading university professors and scientists were represented in the membership of the Society in the 20th century.

See also
 List of mountains in Croatia
 List of caves in Croatia

References

External links
 Hrvatsko planinarsko društvo aka Croatian Mountaineering Association
 Croatian Mountaineering Association

Mountaineering Association
Alpine clubs
Organizations established in 1874
1874 establishments in Croatia